{{maplink|type1=point|coord1= 
  |frame=yes|zoom=2|text=Holotype site (MCZ 43121): central Atlantic Ocean<ref name=afd>{{cite web|url=https://biodiversity.org.au/afd/taxa/Diaphus_bertelseni|title=Australian Faunal Directory: Diaphus bertelseni|website=biodiversity.org.au|access-date=2022-09-21}}</ref>}} Diaphus bertelseni, or Bertelsen's lanternfish, is a species of oceanodromous lanternfish, first described in 1966 by Basil Nafpaktitis. 

Etymology
The species epithet, bertelseni, honours the Danish ichthyologist, Erik Bertelsen.

 Habitat and distribution Diaphus bertelseni lives in the Eastern Atlantic, Western Atlantic, Southwest Pacific, and Eastern Pacific at depths up to 300 meters. They are mostly at 200 to 300 meters deep during the day, and 60 to 175 meters deep at night.

 Description Diaphus bertelseni'' grows to a length of 9.1 cm, and can have up to 15 dorsal fins, 15 anal fins, 8 pelvic fins, 18 gill rakers, and 35 lateral lines. Their coloring is dark with paler photophores.

References 

Taxa named by Basil Nafpaktitis
Fish described in 1966
Myctophidae
Fish of the East Atlantic
Fish of the Western Atlantic
Fish of the Pacific Ocean